The 5th LG Cup featured :

 11 players from South Korea - Cho Hunhyun, Kim Seong-ryong, Lee Chang-ho, Lee Sang-Hoon, Lee Sedol, Rui Naiwei, Seo Bongsoo, Woon Soo-ho, Yang Koon, Yoo Changhyuk, Yoon Sunghyun
 5 players from China - Chang Hao, Ma Xiaochun, Shao Weigang, Yu Bin, Zhou Heyang
 5 players from Japan - Cho Chikun, Hikosaka Naoto, Kobayashi Satoru, O Rissei, Yoda Norimoto
 1 player from Taiwan - Zhou Junxun
 1 player from North America - Michael Redmond
 1 player from Europe - Catalin Taranu

Knockout stages

Final

LG Cup (Go)
2001 in go